The Department of Employment, Education, Training and Youth Affairs was an Australian government department that existed between March 1996 and October 1998.

Scope
Information about the department's functions and/or government funding allocation could be found in the Administrative Arrangements Orders, the annual Portfolio Budget Statements, in the Department's annual reports and on the Department's website.

At its creation, the Department was responsible for the following:
Education, other than migrant adult education       
Youth Affairs       
Employment and training 
Commonwealth Employment Service       
Labour market programs       
Co-ordination of research policy       
Research grants and fellowship.

Structure
The Department was an Australian Public Service department, staffed by officials who were responsible to the Minister for Employment, Education, Training and Youth Affairs.

References

Ministries established in 1996
Employment, Education, Training and Youth Affairs